Samuel James Andrews (July 31, 1817 in Danbury, Connecticut – October 11, 1906 in Hartford, Connecticut) was an Irvingite divine.

Life
He graduated from Williams College in 1839 and  practiced law for some years, but turned his attention to theology, and was a Congregational clergyman from 1848 to 1855.  In 1856 he became pastor of the Catholic and Apostolic Church (Irvingite) at Hartford, Connecticut.

Works
Andrews's publications include:  
 Sufferings of Union Soldiers in Southern Prisons: Transcript of Andersonville Trial (1870)
 God's Revelations of Himself to Men (1885)
 Life of our Lord upon the Earth, Considered in its Historical, Chronological, and Geographical Relations (New York, 1863; new and wholly revised edition, 1891)
 Christianity and Anti-Christianity in their Final Conflict (1898)
 The Church and its Organic Ministry (1899)
 God's Revelations of Himself to Men (1901)

Notes

References
 
 

People from Danbury, Connecticut
Williams College alumni
American Christian clergy
19th-century Congregationalist ministers
American religious writers
1817 births
1906 deaths
19th-century American clergy